

Seeds
A champion seed is indicated in bold text while text in italics indicates the round in which that seed was eliminated.

  Andy Roddick (quarterfinals)
  James Blake (first round)
  Robby Ginepri (first round)
  Marcos Baghdatis (second round, retired because of a back injury)
  Tommy Haas (semifinals, retired because of a wrist injury)
  Luis Horna (first round)
  Paul Goldstein (semifinals)
  Juan Mónaco (first round)

Draw

External links
 2006 U.S. Men's Clay Court Championships draw
 2006 U.S. Men's Clay Court Championships Qualifying draw

Singles